The 2000 Scheldeprijs was the 87th edition of the Scheldeprijs cycle race and was held on 19 April 2000. The race was won by Endrio Leoni of the Alessio team.

General classification

References

2000
2000 in road cycling
2000 in Belgian sport